The Rath Packing Company Administration Building, also known as Adams Store Inc., is a historic Late Gothic Revival building in Waterloo, Iowa.

It is a surviving remnant of what was the largest meat-packing plant in the United States in 1941. The plant started in 1891 with hogs, and was "massive". The company was the 5th biggest at the end of World War II, in 1945. In 1966 it was the ninth largest, and it was also the 249th biggest industrial company of any kind in the United States. It closed in 1985.

Preservation of the larger complex as a historic district was sought, but was not obtained, as the specialized industrial buildings rapidly deteriorated.

The administration building, completed in 1925, is unlike all other buildings in the plant, in that it was designed by a local architect, who was John S. Hartley (1891/92–1985). It was built by the John G. Miller Construction Company, which had submitted the low bid, $78,496, for the project. An extension was later added by contractor Tom McDonald.

It was listed on the National Register of Historic Places in 2008.

See also
Rath Packing Company

References

External links

National Register of Historic Places in Black Hawk County, Iowa
Gothic Revival architecture in Iowa
Historic American Engineering Record in Iowa
Buildings and structures completed in 1925
Buildings and structures in Waterloo, Iowa
Office buildings on the National Register of Historic Places in Iowa
1925 establishments in Iowa